Radio Day is a 2008 Russian comedy film directed by Dmitriy Dyachenko.

Cast 
 Leonid Barats - Lyosha
 Mikhail Kozyrev - Mikhail Natanovich
 Dmitry Maryanov - DJ Dim
 Kamil Larin - Kamil
 Nonna Grishayeva - Nonna

References

External links 

2008 comedy films
2008 films
Russian comedy films